Barbara Walker may refer to:

 Barbara G. Walker (born 1930), American author and feminist
 Barbara Jo Walker (1926–2000), American beauty pageant contestant, Miss America in 1947
 Barbara Walker (artist) (born 1964), British artist
 Barbara K. Walker, writer of Teeny-Tiny and the Witch-Woman
 Barbara S. Walker (1935-2014), Outdoor advocate and namesake of the Barbara Walker Crossing in Portland, Oregon